Oscar Egede-Nissen (March 7, 1903 – November 1, 1976) was a Norwegian actor. He appeared in dozens of films from his debut in 1936 onward, his last being An-Magritt in 1969.

Egede-Nissen was an unruly child, and he was sent to the alternative Odenwald School in Germany. He came home and started high school, but soon left again, this time on a long trip to South America. He went whaling and spent time in Buenos Aires. He ended up as an illegal immigrant to the United States, where he became a professional soldier and flew to the Philippines. There he had a falling out with a lieutenant, and he was sentenced to ten years' imprisonment. With the help of connections in Norway, including Prime Minister Johan Ludwig Mowinckel, he was pardoned after 14 months.

When he returned to Norway this time, his own abilities—and the family's connections—in theater became decisive for his future. He started performing at the National Theater in Bergen, where he made his debut in Hamlet in 1932, playing opposite the famous Magda Blanc. He was successful in the role and was engaged at the theater.

During the Second World War he was arrested on January 6, 1941, and on February 21 he was placed in Vollan Prison. On February 17, 1942, he was transferred to Bredtveit Prison, before being released on March 2.

Egede-Nissen was also imprisoned in the Cameroonian city of Douala for several summer months in 1955 as the result of a fight ending in a death on the Oslo-registered boat Slemdal on May 3, 1955. Three years later, he appeared in Arne Skouen's film Pastor Jarman kommer hjem in the role of a stoker, which he had personal experience with. Similarly, three years later he played a prisoner in a drunken arrest in the film Hans Nielsen Hauge (1961). Before the Second World War, Egede-Nissen appeared in Tancred Ibsen's film Valfångare (1939) as the helmsman Olav Lykke. In Vi vil leve from 1946, he played the telegraph operator Harald. He also had a bit role in the film Freske fraspark, which was based on Kjell Aukrust's stories. In addition, he played a number of roles in various productions for NRK's Radio Theater.

Egede-Nissen was the son of the patriarch of the Communist Party of Norway Adam Egede-Nissen and Goggi Egede-Nissen. He was the brother of the actors Aud Richter, Gerd Grieg, Ada Kramm, Stig Egede-Nissen, Lill Egede-Nissen, and Gøril Havrevold. His wife Unni Torkildsen (1901–1968) was also an actress.

Selected filmography
1936: Vi bygger landet as Ole Larsen
1936: Vi vil oss et land... as a worker
1937: By og land hand i hand as Ole Larsen, a speculator
1937: Bra mennesker as Peder Basen
1937: Fant as Oscar
1939: Valfångare as Olav Lykke, the helmsman
1940: Bastard as Vasily's Russian friend
1942: Trysil-Knut as a log rafter
1943: Vigdis as a farm boy
1943: Den nye lægen as Jentoft
1944: Kommer du, Elsa? as a vagabond
1946: Englandsfarere as Cramer
1946: Vi vil leve as Harald Bakken
1951: Skadeskutt as a doctor
1953: Ung frue forsvunnet as Jørn
1954: Suicide Mission as Peter Salen
1955: Hjem går vi ikke
1956: Kvinnens plass as a man that saw a UFO
1958: Pastor Jarman kommer hjem as a stoker
1959: Herren og hans tjenere
1961: Hans Nielsen Hauge as the man arrested for drunkenness
1963: Freske fraspark as a Tynset resident
1963: Vildanden as Pettersen
1963: An-Magritt as Jürgen, a smelter

References

External links
 
 Oscar Egede-Nissen at the Swedish Film Database
 Oscar Egede-Nissen at Sceneweb
 Oscar Egede-Nissen at Filmfront

1903 births
1976 deaths
Norwegian male stage actors
Norwegian male film actors
20th-century Norwegian male actors
Male actors from Oslo